Energoinvest (full name: Energoinvest, d.d. - Sarajevo) is a multidisciplinary engineering and energy company with headquarters in Sarajevo, Bosnia and Herzegovina.

History
Energoinvest was established as a small design office under the name of "Elektroprojekt" in 1951 with Emerik Blum at the top of the company. Energoinvest has developed into a modern European company whose business is based on the system engineering model of the realized project "turnkey".

In 1958, Energoinvest was an export oriented company conducting business in markets in more than 20 countries from Mexico to Malaysia.

By 1987, Energoinvest was the largest exporter in the former Yugoslavia in reaching its business peak turnover of one billion dollars with 42,000 employees.

Energoinvest has tens of thousands of kilometers of transmission lines, thousands of substations, a number of hydro and thermal power plants, and process and industrial plants on all continents.

References

Further reading

External links

 

Engineering companies of Bosnia and Herzegovina
Companies based in Sarajevo
Design companies established in 1951
1951 establishments in Yugoslavia
Companies of Yugoslavia
Former government-owned companies